Rhopobota dietziana is a species of tortricid moth in the family Tortricidae.

The MONA or Hodges number for Rhopobota dietziana is 3277.

References

Further reading

External links

 

Eucosmini
Moths described in 1907